Invisible Republic may refer to:
 Invisible Republic (book)
 Invisible Republic (album)
 Invisible Republic (comics)